Zhao Lihong (born 4 December 1972) is a Chinese former footballer who played as a midfielder. She competed in the 1996 Summer Olympics and in the 2000 Summer Olympics.

In 1996 she won the silver medal with the Chinese team. She played all five matches and scored one goal.

Four years later she was a member of the Chinese team which finished fifth in the women's tournament. She played all three matches and scored one goal.

She played for the Philadelphia Charge in the Women's United Soccer Association in 2002.

References

External links

profile

1972 births
Living people
Chinese women's footballers
Footballers at the 1996 Summer Olympics
Footballers at the 2000 Summer Olympics
Olympic footballers of China
Olympic silver medalists for China
1995 FIFA Women's World Cup players
Olympic medalists in football
Asian Games medalists in football
Footballers at the 1994 Asian Games
Footballers at the 1998 Asian Games
Footballers at the 2002 Asian Games
Medalists at the 1996 Summer Olympics
China women's international footballers
Asian Games gold medalists for China
Asian Games silver medalists for China
Women's association football midfielders
Medalists at the 1994 Asian Games
Medalists at the 1998 Asian Games
Medalists at the 2002 Asian Games
2003 FIFA Women's World Cup players
1999 FIFA Women's World Cup players
FIFA Century Club
Philadelphia Charge players
Women's United Soccer Association players